In enzymology, a protein N-acetylglucosaminyltransferase is an enzyme that catalyzes the chemical reaction

UDP-N-acetyl-D-glucosamine + protein  UDP + 4-N-(N-acetyl-D-glucosaminyl)-protein

Thus, the two substrates of this enzyme are UDP-N-acetyl-D-glucosamine and protein, whereas its two products are UDP and 4-N-(N-acetyl-D-glucosaminyl)-protein.

This enzyme belongs to the family of glycosyltransferases, specifically the hexosyltransferases.  The systematic name of this enzyme class is UDP-N-acetyl-D-glucosamine:protein beta-N-acetyl-D-glucosaminyl-transferase. Other names in common use include uridine diphosphoacetylglucosamine-protein, acetylglucosaminyltransferase, uridine diphospho-N-acetylglucosamine:polypeptide, beta-N-acetylglucosaminyltransferase, and O-GlcNAc transferase.

References

External links
 

EC 2.4.1
Enzymes of unknown structure